Juan Pablo Montes Montes (born 26 October 1985 in Sulaco, Yoro, Honduras) is a Honduran football player who plays as a defender.

Club career
Montes started his career at Atlético Olanchano, then had a three year-spell at Victoria. He joined Vida in summer 2011 but was out for the season due to a broken foot. Montes moved on to Necaxa in January 2012 and then Platense, changing clubs every season since leaving Victoria.

He joined F.C. Motagua for the 2013–14 season, where he has won several championships.  He was nominated in the Best XI at the 2018 CONCACAF Awards.

International career
Montes made his debut for Honduras in a January 2013 Copa Centroamericana match against El Salvador. As of February 2015, Montes has earned a total of sixteen caps, scoring twice.

International goals
Scores and results list Honduras' goal tally first.

References

External links

 

1985 births
Living people
People from Yoro Department
Association football defenders
Honduran footballers
Honduras international footballers
C.D. Victoria players
C.D.S. Vida players
Platense F.C. players
F.C. Motagua players
Liga Nacional de Fútbol Profesional de Honduras players
2013 Copa Centroamericana players
2014 FIFA World Cup players
2014 Copa Centroamericana players